Plauer See may refer to:

 Plauer See (Mecklenburg-Vorpommern), Germany
 Plauer See (Brandenburg), Germany